Harry Moore (24 January 1928 – 27 January 1989) was an  Australian rules footballer who played with South Melbourne in the Victorian Football League (VFL).

Notes

External links 

1928 births
1989 deaths
Australian rules footballers from Victoria (Australia)
Sydney Swans players